Coal is a combustible black or brownish-black sedimentary rock, formed as rock strata called coal seams. Coal is mostly carbon with variable amounts of other elements, chiefly hydrogen, sulfur, oxygen, and nitrogen.
Coal is a type of fossil fuel, formed when dead plant matter decays into peat and is converted into coal by the heat and pressure of deep burial over millions of years. Vast deposits of coal originate in former wetlands called coal forests that covered much of the Earth's tropical land areas during the late Carboniferous (Pennsylvanian) and Permian times. Many significant coal deposits are younger than this and originate from the Mesozoic and Cenozoic eras.

Coal is used primarily as a fuel. While coal has been known and used for thousands of years, its usage was limited until the Industrial Revolution. With the invention of the steam engine, coal consumption increased. In 2020, coal supplied about a quarter of the world's primary energy and over a third of its electricity. Some iron and steel-making and other industrial processes burn coal.

The extraction and use of coal causes premature death and illness. The use of coal damages the environment, and it is the largest anthropogenic source of carbon dioxide contributing to climate change. Fourteen billion tonnes of carbon dioxide was emitted by burning coal in 2020, which is 40% of the total fossil fuel emissions and over 25% of total global greenhouse gas emissions. As part of worldwide energy transition, many countries have reduced or eliminated their use of coal power. The United Nations Secretary General asked governments to stop building new coal plants by 2020. Global coal use peaked in 2013. To meet the Paris Agreement target of keeping global warming below  coal use needs to halve from 2020 to 2030, and phasing out coal was agreed upon in the Glasgow Climate Pact.

The largest consumer and importer of coal in 2020 was China, which accounts for almost half the world's annual coal production, followed by India with about a tenth. Indonesia and Australia export the most, followed by Russia.

Etymology
The word originally took the form col in Old English, from Proto-Germanic *kula(n), which in turn is hypothesized to come from the Proto-Indo-European root *g(e)u-lo- "live coal". Germanic cognates include the Old Frisian kole, Middle Dutch cole, Dutch kool, Old High German chol, German Kohle and Old Norse kol, and the Irish word gual is also a cognate via the Indo-European root.

Geology

Coal is composed of macerals, minerals and water. Fossils and amber may be found in coal.

Formation

The conversion of dead vegetation into coal is called coalification. At various times in the geologic past, the Earth had dense forests in low-lying wetland areas. In these wetlands, the process of coalification began when dead plant matter was protected from biodegradation and oxidation, usually by mud or acidic water, and was converted into peat. This trapped the carbon in immense peat bogs that were eventually deeply buried by sediments. Then, over millions of years, the heat and pressure of deep burial caused the loss of water, methane and carbon dioxide and increased the proportion of carbon. The grade of coal produced depended on the maximum pressure and temperature reached, with lignite (also called "brown coal") produced under relatively mild conditions, and sub-bituminous coal, bituminous coal, or anthracite coal (also called "hard coal" or "black coal") produced in turn with increasing temperature and pressure.

Of the factors involved in coalification, temperature is much more important than either pressure or time of burial. Subbituminous coal can form at temperatures as low as  while anthracite requires a temperature of at least .

Although coal is known from most geologic periods, 90% of all coal beds were deposited in the Carboniferous and Permian periods, which represent just 2% of the Earth's geologic history. Paradoxically, this was during the Late Paleozoic icehouse, a time of global glaciation. However, the drop in global sea level accompanying the glaciation exposed continental shelfs that had previously been submerged, and to these were added wide river deltas produced by increased erosion due to the drop in base level. These widespread areas of wetlands provided ideal conditions for coal formation. The rapid formation of coal ended with the coal gap in the Permian–Triassic extinction event, where coal is rare.

Favorable geography alone does not explain the extensive Carboniferous coal beds. Other factors contributing to rapid coal deposition were high oxygen levels, above 30%, that promoted intense wildfires and formation of charcoal that was all but indigestible by decomposing organisms; high carbon dioxide levels that promoted plant growth; and the nature of Carboniferous forests, which included lycophyte trees whose determinate growth meant that carbon was not tied up in heartwood of living trees for long periods.

One theory suggested that about 360 million years ago, some plants evolved the ability to produce lignin, a complex polymer that made their cellulose stems much harder and more woody. The ability to produce lignin led to the evolution of the first trees. But bacteria and fungi did not immediately evolve the ability to decompose lignin, so the wood did not fully decay but became buried under sediment, eventually turning into coal. About 300 million years ago, mushrooms and other fungi developed this ability, ending the main coal-formation period of earth's history. Although some authors pointed at some evidence of lignin degradation during the Carboniferous, and suggested that climatic and tectonic factors were a more plausible explanation, reconstruction of ancestral enzymes by phylogenetic analysis corroborated a hypothesis that lignin degrading enzymes appeared in fungi approximately 200 MYa.

One likely tectonic factor was the Central Pangean Mountains, an enormous range running along the equator that reached its greatest elevation near this time. Climate modeling suggests that the Central Pangean Mountains contributed to the deposition of vast quantities of coal in the late Carboniferous. The mountains created an area of year-round heavy precipitation, with no dry season typical of a monsoon climate. This is necessary for the preservation of peat in coal swamps.

Coal is known from Precambrian strata, which predate land plants. This coal is presumed to have originated from residues of algae.

Sometimes coal seams (also known as coal beds) are interbedded with other sediments in a cyclothem. Cyclothems are thought to have their origin in glacial cycles that produced fluctuations in sea level, which alternately exposed and then flooded large areas of continental shelf.

Chemistry of coalification
The woody tissue of plants is composed mainly of cellulose, hemicellulose, and lignin. Modern peat is mostly lignin, with a content of cellulose and hemicellulose ranging from 5% to 40%. Various other organic compounds, such as waxes and nitrogen- and sulfur-containing compounds, are also present. Lignin has a weight composition of about 54% carbon, 6% hydrogen, and 30% oxygen, while cellulose has a weight composition of about 44% carbon, 6% hydrogen, and 49% oxygen. Bituminous coal has a composition of about 84.4% carbon, 5.4% hydrogen, 6.7% oxygen, 1.7% nitrogen, and 1.8% sulfur, on a weight basis. This implies that chemical processes during coalification must remove most of the oxygen and much of the hydrogen, leaving carbon, a process called carbonization.

Carbonization proceeds primarily by dehydration, decarboxylation, and demethanation. Dehydration removes water molecules from the maturing coal via reactions such as

2 R–OH → R–O–R + H2O
2 R-CH2-O-CH2-R → R-CH=CH-R + H2O

Decarboxylation removes carbon dioxide from the maturing coal and proceeds by reaction such as

RCOOH  →  RH  +  CO2

while demethanation proceeds by reaction such as

2 R-CH3 → R-CH2-R + CH4
R-CH2-CH2-CH2-R → R-CH=CH-R + CH4

In each of these formulas, R represents the remainder of a cellulose or lignin molecule to which the reacting groups are attached.

Dehydration and decarboxylation take place early in coalification, while demethanation begins only after the coal has already reached bituminous rank. The effect of decarboxylation is to reduce the percentage of oxygen, while demethanation reduces the percentage of hydrogen. Dehydration does both, and (together with demethanation) reduces the saturation of the carbon backbone (increasing the number of double bonds between carbon).

As carbonization proceeds, aliphatic compounds (carbon compounds characterized by chains of carbon atoms) are replaced by aromatic compounds (carbon compounds characterized by rings of carbon atoms) and aromatic rings begin to fuse into polyaromatic compounds (linked rings of carbon atoms). The structure increasingly resembles graphene, the structural element of graphite.

Chemical changes are accompanied by physical changes, such as decrease in average pore size. The macerals (organic particles) of lignite are composed of huminite, which is earthy in appearance. As the coal matures to sub-bituminous coal, huminite begins to be replaced by vitreous (shiny) vitrinite. Maturation of bituminous coal is characterized by bitumenization, in which part of the coal is converted to bitumen, a hydrocarbon-rich gel. Maturation to anthracite is characterized by debitumenization (from demethanation) and the increasing tendency of the anthracite to break with a conchoidal fracture, similar to the way thick glass breaks.

Types

As geological processes apply pressure to dead biotic material over time, under suitable conditions, its metamorphic grade or rank increases successively into:
 Peat, a precursor of coal
 Lignite, or brown coal, the lowest rank of coal, most harmful to health when burned, used almost exclusively as fuel for electric power generation
 Jet, a compact form of lignite, sometimes polished; used as an ornamental stone since the Upper Palaeolithic
 Sub-bituminous coal, whose properties range between those of lignite and those of bituminous coal, is used primarily as fuel for steam-electric power generation.
 Bituminous coal, a dense sedimentary rock, usually black, but sometimes dark brown, often with well-defined bands of bright and dull material. It is used primarily as fuel in steam-electric power generation and to make coke. Known as steam coal in the UK, and historically used to raise steam in steam locomotives and ships 
 Anthracite coal, the highest rank of coal, is a harder, glossy black coal used primarily for residential and commercial space heating.
 Graphite is difficult to ignite and not commonly used as fuel; it is most used in pencils, or powdered for lubrication.
 Cannel coal (sometimes called "candle coal") is a variety of fine-grained, high-rank coal with significant hydrogen content, which consists primarily of liptinite.

There are several international standards for coal. The classification of coal is generally based on the content of volatiles. However the most important distinction is between thermal coal (also known as steam coal), which is burnt to generate electricity via steam; and metallurgical coal (also known as coking coal), which is burnt at high temperature to make steel.

Hilt's law is a geological observation that (within a small area) the deeper the coal is found, the higher its rank (or grade). It applies if the thermal gradient is entirely vertical; however, metamorphism may cause lateral changes of rank, irrespective of depth. For example, some of the coal seams of the Madrid, New Mexico coal field were partially converted to anthracite by contact metamorphism from an igneous sill while the remainder of the seams remained as bituminous coal.

History

The earliest recognized use is from the Shenyang area of China where by 4000 BC Neolithic inhabitants had begun carving ornaments from black lignite. Coal from the Fushun mine in northeastern China was used to smelt copper as early as 1000 BC. Marco Polo, the Italian who traveled to China in the 13th century, described coal as "black stones ... which burn like logs", and said coal was so plentiful, people could take three hot baths a week. In Europe, the earliest reference to the use of coal as fuel is from the geological treatise On Stones (Lap. 16) by the Greek scientist Theophrastus (c. 371–287 BC):

Outcrop coal was used in Britain during the Bronze Age (3000–2000 BC), where it formed part of funeral pyres. In Roman Britain, with the exception of two modern fields, "the Romans were exploiting coals in all the major coalfields in England and Wales by the end of the second century AD". Evidence of trade in coal, dated to about AD 200, has been found at the Roman settlement at Heronbridge, near Chester; and in the Fenlands of East Anglia, where coal from the Midlands was transported via the Car Dyke for use in drying grain. Coal cinders have been found in the hearths of villas and Roman forts, particularly in Northumberland, dated to around AD 400. In the west of England, contemporary writers described the wonder of a permanent brazier of coal on the altar of Minerva at Aquae Sulis (modern day Bath), although in fact easily accessible surface coal from what became the Somerset coalfield was in common use in quite lowly dwellings locally. Evidence of coal's use for iron-working in the city during the Roman period has been found. In Eschweiler, Rhineland, deposits of bituminous coal were used by the Romans for the smelting of iron ore.

No evidence exists of coal being of great importance in Britain before about AD 1000, the High Middle Ages. Coal came to be referred to as "seacoal" in the 13th century; the wharf where the material arrived in London was known as Seacoal Lane, so identified in a charter of King Henry III granted in 1253. Initially, the name was given because much coal was found on the shore, having fallen from the exposed coal seams on cliffs above or washed out of underwater coal outcrops, but by the time of Henry VIII, it was understood to derive from the way it was carried to London by sea. In 1257–1259, coal from Newcastle upon Tyne was shipped to London for the smiths and lime-burners building Westminster Abbey. Seacoal Lane and Newcastle Lane, where coal was unloaded at wharves along the River Fleet, still exist.

These easily accessible sources had largely become exhausted (or could not meet the growing demand) by the 13th century, when underground extraction by shaft mining or adits was developed. The alternative name was "pitcoal", because it came from mines.

Cooking and home heating with coal (in addition to firewood or instead of it) has been done in various times and places throughout human history, especially in times and places where ground-surface coal was available and firewood was scarce, but a widespread reliance on coal for home hearths probably never existed until such a switch in fuels happened in London in the late sixteenth and early seventeenth centuries. Historian Ruth Goodman has traced the socioeconomic effects of that switch and its later spread throughout Britain and suggested that its importance in shaping the industrial adoption of coal has been previously underappreciated.

The development of the Industrial Revolution led to the large-scale use of coal, as the steam engine took over from the water wheel. In 1700, five-sixths of the world's coal was mined in Britain. Britain would have run out of suitable sites for watermills by the 1830s if coal had not been available as a source of energy. In 1947 there were some 750,000 miners in Britain but the last deep coal mine in the UK closed in 2015.

A grade between bituminous coal and anthracite was once known as "steam coal" as it was widely used as a fuel for steam locomotives. In this specialized use, it is sometimes known as "sea coal" in the United States. Small "steam coal", also called dry small steam nuts (DSSN), was used as a fuel for domestic water heating.

Coal played an important role in industry in the 19th and 20th century. The predecessor of the European Union, the European Coal and Steel Community, was based on the trading of this commodity.

Coal continues to arrive on beaches around the world from both natural erosion of exposed coal seams and windswept spills from cargo ships. Many homes in such areas gather this coal as a significant, and sometimes primary, source of home heating fuel.

Chemistry

Composition
The composition of coal is reported either as a proximate analysis (moisture, volatile matter, fixed carbon, and ash) or an ultimate analysis (ash, carbon, hydrogen, nitrogen, oxygen, and sulfur). The "volatile matter" does not exist by itself (except for some adsorbed methane) but designates the volatile compounds that are produced and driven off by heating the coal. A typical bituminous coal may have an ultimate analysis on a dry, ash-free basis of 84.4% carbon, 5.4% hydrogen, 6.7% oxygen, 1.7% nitrogen, and 1.8% sulfur, on a weight basis.

The composition of ash, given in terms of oxides, varies:

Other minor components include:

Coking coal and use of coke to smelt iron

Coke is a solid carbonaceous residue derived from coking coal (a low-ash, low-sulfur bituminous coal, also known as metallurgical coal), which is used in manufacturing steel and other iron products. Coke is made from coking coal by baking in an oven without oxygen at temperatures as high as 1,000 °C, driving off the volatile constituents and fusing together the fixed carbon and residual ash. Metallurgical coke is used as a fuel and as a reducing agent in smelting iron ore in a blast furnace.  The carbon monoxide produced by its combustion reduces hematite (an iron oxide) to iron.

Waste carbon dioxide is also produced  together with pig iron, which is too rich in dissolved carbon so must be treated further to make steel.

Coking coal should be low in ash, sulfur, and phosphorus, so that these do not migrate to the metal.
The coke must be strong enough to resist the weight of overburden in the blast furnace, which is why coking coal is so important in making steel using the conventional route. Coke from coal is grey, hard, and porous and has a heating value of 29.6 MJ/kg. Some cokemaking processes produce byproducts, including coal tar, ammonia, light oils, and coal gas.

Petroleum coke (petcoke) is the solid residue obtained in oil refining, which resembles coke but contains too many impurities to be useful in metallurgical applications.

Use in foundry components 
Finely ground bituminous coal, known in this application as sea coal, is a constituent of foundry sand. While the molten metal is in the mould, the coal burns slowly, releasing reducing gases at pressure, and so preventing the metal from penetrating the pores of the sand. It is also contained in 'mould wash', a paste or liquid with the same function applied to the mould before casting. Sea coal can be mixed with the clay lining (the "bod") used for the bottom of a cupola furnace. When heated, the coal decomposes and the bod becomes slightly friable, easing the process of breaking open holes for tapping the molten metal.

Alternatives to coke
Scrap steel can be recycled in an electric arc furnace; and an alternative to making iron by smelting is direct reduced iron, where any carbonaceous fuel can be used to make sponge or pelletised iron. To lessen carbon dioxide emissions hydrogen can be used as the reducing agent and biomass or waste as the source of carbon. Historically, charcoal has been used as an alternative to coke in a blast furnace, with the resultant iron being known as charcoal iron.

Gasification

Coal gasification, as part of an integrated gasification combined cycle (IGCC) coal-fired power station, is used to produce syngas, a mixture of carbon monoxide (CO) and hydrogen (H2) gas to fire gas turbines to produce electricity. Syngas can also be converted into transportation fuels, such as gasoline and diesel, through the Fischer–Tropsch process; alternatively, syngas can be converted into methanol, which can be blended into fuel directly or converted to gasoline via the methanol to gasoline process. Gasification combined with Fischer–Tropsch technology was used by the Sasol chemical company of South Africa to make chemicals and motor vehicle fuels from coal.

During gasification, the coal is mixed with oxygen and steam while also being heated and pressurized. During the reaction, oxygen and water molecules oxidize the coal into carbon monoxide (CO), while also releasing hydrogen gas (H2). This used to be done in underground coal mines, and also to make town gas, which was piped to customers to burn for illumination, heating, and cooking.

 3C (as Coal) + O2 + H2O → H2 + 3CO

If the refiner wants to produce gasoline, the syngas is routed into a Fischer–Tropsch reaction. This is known as indirect coal liquefaction. If hydrogen is the desired end-product, however, the syngas is fed into the water gas shift reaction, where more hydrogen is liberated:

 CO + H2O → CO2 + H2

Liquefaction

Coal can be converted directly into synthetic fuels equivalent to gasoline or diesel by hydrogenation or carbonization. Coal liquefaction emits more carbon dioxide than liquid fuel production from crude oil. Mixing in biomass and using CCS would emit slightly less than the oil process but at a high cost. State owned China Energy Investment runs a coal liquefaction plant and plans to build 2 more.

Coal liquefaction may also refer to the cargo hazard when shipping coal.

Production of chemicals

Chemicals have been produced from coal since the 1950s. Coal can be used as a feedstock in the production of a wide range of chemical fertilizers and other chemical products. The main route to these products was coal gasification to produce syngas. Primary chemicals that are produced directly from the syngas include methanol, hydrogen and carbon monoxide, which are the chemical building blocks from which a whole spectrum of derivative chemicals are manufactured, including olefins, acetic acid, formaldehyde, ammonia, urea and others. The versatility of syngas as a precursor to primary chemicals and high-value derivative products provides the option of using coal to produce a wide range of commodities. In the 21st century, however, the use of coal bed methane is becoming more important.

Because the slate of chemical products that can be made via coal gasification can in general also use feedstocks derived from natural gas and petroleum, the chemical industry tends to use whatever feedstocks are most cost-effective. Therefore, interest in using coal tended to increase for higher oil and natural gas prices and during periods of high global economic growth that might have strained oil and gas production.

Coal to chemical processes require substantial quantities of water. Much coal to chemical production is in China where coal dependent provinces such as Shanxi are struggling to control its pollution.

Electricity generation

Energy density

The energy density of coal is roughly 24 megajoules per kilogram (approximately 6.7 kilowatt-hours per kg). For a coal power plant with a 40% efficiency, it takes an estimated  of coal to power a 100 W lightbulb for one year.

27.6% of world energy was supplied by coal in 2017 and Asia used almost three-quarters of it.

Precombustion treatment

Refined coal is the product of a coal-upgrading technology that removes moisture and certain pollutants from lower-rank coals such as sub-bituminous and lignite (brown) coals. It is one form of several precombustion treatments and processes for coal that alter coal's characteristics before it is burned. Thermal efficiency improvements are achievable by improved pre-drying (especially relevant with high-moisture fuel such as lignite or biomass). The goals of precombustion coal technologies are to increase efficiency and reduce emissions when the coal is burned. Precombustion technology can sometimes be used as a supplement to postcombustion technologies to control emissions from coal-fueled boilers.

Power plant combustion

Coal burnt as a solid fuel in coal power stations to generate electricity is called thermal coal. Coal is also used to produce very high temperatures through combustion. Early deaths due to air pollution have been estimated at 200 per GW-year, however they may be higher around power plants where scrubbers are not used or lower if they are far from cities. Efforts around the world to reduce the use of coal have led some regions to switch to natural gas and electricity from lower carbon sources.

When coal is used for electricity generation, it is usually pulverized and then burned in a furnace with a boiler (see also Pulverized coal-fired boiler). The furnace heat converts boiler water to steam, which is then used to spin turbines which turn generators and create electricity. The thermodynamic efficiency of this process varies between about 25% and 50% depending on the pre-combustion treatment, turbine technology (e.g. supercritical steam generator) and the age of the plant.

A few integrated gasification combined cycle (IGCC) power plants have been built, which burn coal more efficiently. Instead of pulverizing the coal and burning it directly as fuel in the steam-generating boiler, the coal is gasified to create syngas, which is burned in a gas turbine to produce electricity (just like natural gas is burned in a turbine). Hot exhaust gases from the turbine are used to raise steam in a heat recovery steam generator which powers a supplemental steam turbine. The overall plant efficiency when used to provide combined heat and power can reach as much as 94%. IGCC power plants emit less local pollution than conventional pulverized coal-fueled plants; however the technology for carbon capture and storage (CCS) after gasification and before burning has so far proved to be too expensive to use with coal. Other ways to use coal are as coal-water slurry fuel (CWS), which was developed in the Soviet Union, or in an MHD topping cycle. However these are not widely used due to lack of profit.

In 2017 38% of the world's electricity came from coal, the same percentage as 30 years previously. In 2018 global installed capacity was 2TW (of which 1TW is in China) which was 30% of total electricity generation capacity. The most dependent major country is South Africa, with over 80% of its electricity generated by coal; but China alone generates more than half of the world's coal-generated electricity.

Maximum use of coal was reached in 2013. In 2018 coal-fired power station capacity factor averaged 51%, that is they operated for about half their available operating hours.

Coal industry

Mining

About 8000 Mt of coal are produced annually, about 90% of which is hard coal and 10% lignite.  just over half is from underground mines. More accidents occur during underground mining than surface mining. Not all countries publish mining accident statistics so worldwide figures are uncertain, but it is thought that most deaths occur in coal mining accidents in China: in 2017 there were 375 coal mining related deaths in China. Most coal mined is thermal coal (also called steam coal as it is used to make steam to generate electricity) but metallurgical coal (also called "metcoal" or "coking coal" as it is used to make coke to make iron) accounts for 10% to 15% of global coal use.

As a traded commodity

China mines almost half the world's coal, followed by India with about a tenth. Australia accounts for about a third of world coal exports, followed by Indonesia and Russia, while the largest importers are Japan and India.

The price of metallurgical coal is volatile and much higher than the price of thermal coal because metallurgical coal must be lower in sulfur and requires more cleaning. Coal futures contracts provide coal producers and the electric power industry an important tool for hedging and risk management.

In some countries new onshore wind or solar generation already costs less than coal power from existing plants. 
However, for China this is forecast for the early 2020s and for southeast Asia not until the late 2020s. In India building new plants is uneconomic and, despite being subsidized, existing plants are losing market share to renewables.

Market trends
Of the countries which produce coal China mines by far the most, almost half the world's coal, followed by less than 10% by India. China is also by far the largest consumer. Therefore, market trends depend on Chinese energy policy. Although the effort to reduce pollution means that the global long-term trend is to burn less coal, the short and medium term trends may differ, in part due to Chinese financing of new coal-fired power plants in other countries.

Major producers

Countries with annual production higher than 300 million tonnes are shown.

Major consumers
Countries with annual consumption higher than 500 million tonnes are shown. Shares are based on data expressed in tonnes oil equivalent.

Major exporters

Exporters are at risk of a reduction in import demand from India and China.

Major importers

Damage to human health

The use of coal as fuel causes ill health and deaths. Mining and processing of coal causes air and water pollution. Coal-powered plants emit nitrogen oxides, sulfur dioxide, particulate pollution and heavy metals, which adversely affect human health. Coal bed methane extraction is important to avoid mining accidents.

The deadly London smog was caused primarily by the heavy use of coal. Globally coal is estimated to cause 800,000 premature deaths every year, mostly in India and China.

Burning coal is a major emitter of sulfur dioxide, which creates PM2.5 particulates, the most dangerous form of air pollution.

Coal smokestack emissions cause asthma, strokes, reduced intelligence, artery blockages, heart attacks, congestive heart failure, cardiac arrhythmias, mercury poisoning, arterial occlusion, and lung cancer.

Annual health costs in Europe from use of coal to generate electricity are estimated at up to €43 billion.

In China, improvements to air quality and human health would increase with more stringent climate policies, mainly because the country's energy is so heavily reliant on coal. And there would be a net economic benefit.

A 2017 study in the Economic Journal found that for Britain during the period 1851–1860, "a one standard deviation increase in coal use raised infant mortality by 6–8% and that industrial coal use explains roughly one-third of the urban mortality penalty observed during this period."

Breathing in coal dust causes coalworker's pneumoconiosis or "black lung", so called because the coal dust literally turns the lungs black from their usual pink color. In the US alone, it is estimated that 1,500 former employees of the coal industry die every year from the effects of breathing in coal mine dust.

Huge amounts of coal ash and other waste is produced annually. Use of coal generates hundreds of millions of tons of ash and other waste products every year. These include fly ash, bottom ash, and flue-gas desulfurization sludge, that contain mercury, uranium, thorium, arsenic, and other heavy metals, along with non-metals such as selenium.

Around 10% of coal is ash: coal ash is hazardous and toxic to human beings and some other living things. Coal ash contains the radioactive elements uranium and thorium. Coal ash and other solid combustion byproducts are stored locally and escape in various ways that expose those living near coal plants to radiation and environmental toxics.

Damage to the environment

Coal mining, coal combustion wastes and flue gas are causing major environmental damage.

Water systems are affected by coal mining. For example, mining affects groundwater and water table levels and acidity. Spills of fly ash, such as the Kingston Fossil Plant coal fly ash slurry spill, can also contaminate land and waterways, and destroy homes. Power stations that burn coal also consume large quantities of water. This can affect the flows of rivers, and has consequential impacts on other land uses. In areas of water scarcity, such as the Thar Desert in Pakistan, coal mining and coal power plants would use significant quantities of water.

One of the earliest known impacts of coal on the water cycle was acid rain. In 2014 approximately 100 Tg/S of sulfur dioxide (SO2) was released, over half of which was from burning coal. After release, the sulfur dioxide is oxidized to H2SO4 which scatters solar radiation, hence its increase in the atmosphere exerts a cooling effect on climate. This beneficially masks some of the warming caused by increased greenhouse gases. However, the sulfur is precipitated out of the atmosphere as acid rain in a matter of weeks, whereas carbon dioxide remains in the atmosphere for hundreds of years. Release of SO2 also contributes to the widespread acidification of ecosystems.

Disused coal mines can also cause issues. Subsidence can occur above tunnels, causing damage to infrastructure or cropland. Coal mining can also cause long lasting fires, and it has been estimated that thousands of coal seam fires are burning at any given time. For example, Brennender Berg has been burning since 1668 and is still burning in the 21st century.

The production of coke from coal produces ammonia, coal tar, and gaseous compounds as byproducts which if discharged to land, air or waterways can pollute the environment. The Whyalla steelworks is one example of a coke producing facility where liquid ammonia was discharged to the marine environment.

Emission intensity
Emission intensity is the greenhouse gas emitted over the life of a generator per unit of electricity generated. The emission intensity of coal power stations is high, as they emit around 1000 g of CO2eq for each kWh generated, while natural gas is medium-emission intensity at around 500 g CO2eq per kWh. The emission intensity of coal varies with type and generator technology and exceeds 1200 g per kWh in some countries.

Underground fires

Thousands of coal fires are burning around the world. Those burning underground can be difficult to locate and many cannot be extinguished. Fires can cause the ground above to subside, their combustion gases are dangerous to life, and breaking out to the surface can initiate surface wildfires. Coal seams can be set on fire by spontaneous combustion or contact with a mine fire or surface fire. Lightning strikes are an important source of ignition. The coal continues to burn slowly back into the seam until oxygen (air) can no longer reach the flame front. A grass fire in a coal area can set dozens of coal seams on fire. Coal fires in China burn an estimated 120 million tons of coal a year, emitting 360 million metric tons of CO2, amounting to 2–3% of the annual worldwide production of CO2 from fossil fuels. In Centralia, Pennsylvania (a borough located in the Coal Region of the U.S.), an exposed vein of anthracite ignited in 1962 due to a trash fire in the borough landfill, located in an abandoned anthracite strip mine pit. Attempts to extinguish the fire were unsuccessful, and it continues to burn underground to this day. The Australian Burning Mountain was originally believed to be a volcano, but the smoke and ash come from a coal fire that has been burning for some 6,000 years.

At Kuh i Malik in Yagnob Valley, Tajikistan, coal deposits have been burning for thousands of years, creating vast underground labyrinths full of unique minerals, some of them very beautiful.

The reddish siltstone rock that caps many ridges and buttes in the Powder River Basin in Wyoming and in western North Dakota is called porcelanite, which resembles the coal burning waste "clinker" or volcanic "scoria". Clinker is rock that has been fused by the natural burning of coal. In the Powder River Basin approximately 27 to 54 billion tons of coal burned within the past three million years. Wild coal fires in the area were reported by the Lewis and Clark Expedition as well as explorers and settlers in the area.

Climate change

The largest and most long-term effect of coal use is the release of carbon dioxide, a greenhouse gas that causes climate change. Coal-fired power plants were the single largest contributor to the growth in global CO2 emissions in 2018, 40% of the total fossil fuel emissions, and more than a quarter of total emissions. Coal mining can emit methane, another greenhouse gas.

In 2016 world gross carbon dioxide emissions from coal usage were 14.5 gigatonnes. For every megawatt-hour generated, coal-fired electric power generation emits around a tonne of carbon dioxide, which is double the approximately 500 kg of carbon dioxide released by a natural gas-fired electric plant. In 2013, the head of the UN climate agency advised that most of the world's coal reserves should be left in the ground to avoid catastrophic global warming. To keep global warming below 1.5 °C or 2 °C hundreds, or possibly thousands, of coal-fired power plants will need to be retired early.

Pollution mitigation

Standards
Local pollution standards include GB13223-2011 (China), India, the Industrial Emissions Directive (EU) and the Clean Air Act (United States).

Satellite monitoring

Satellite monitoring is now used to crosscheck national data, for example Sentinel-5 Precursor has shown that Chinese control of SO2 has only been partially successful. It has also revealed that low use of technology such as SCR has resulted in high NO2 emissions in South Africa and India.

Combined cycle power plants
A few Integrated gasification combined cycle (IGCC) coal-fired power plants have been built with coal gasification. Although they burn coal more efficiently and therefore emit less pollution, the technology has not generally proved economically viable for coal, except possibly in Japan although this is controversial.

Carbon capture and storage

Although still being intensively researched and considered economically viable for some uses other than with coal; carbon capture and storage has been tested at the Petra Nova and Boundary Dam coal-fired power plants and has been found to be technically feasible but not economically viable for use with coal, due to reductions in the cost of solar PV technology.

Economics
In 2018  was invested in coal supply but almost all for sustaining production levels rather than opening new mines.
In the long term coal and oil could cost the world trillions of dollars per year. Coal alone may cost Australia billions, whereas costs to some smaller companies or cities could be on the scale of millions of dollars. The economies most damaged by coal (via climate change) may be India and the US as they are the countries with the highest social cost of carbon. Bank loans to finance coal are a risk to the Indian economy.

China is the largest producer of coal in the world. It is the world's largest energy consumer, and coal in China supplies 60% of its primary energy. However two fifths of China's coal power stations are estimated to be loss-making.

Air pollution from coal storage and handling costs the US almost 200 dollars for every extra ton stored, due to PM2.5. Coal pollution costs the  each year. Measures to cut air pollution benefit individuals financially and the economies of countries such as China.

Subsidies

In the EU state aid to new coal-fired plants is banned from 2020, and to existing coal-fired plants from 2025. As of 2018, government funding for new coal power plants was supplied by Exim Bank of China, the Japan Bank for International Cooperation and Indian public sector banks. Coal in Kazakhstan was the main recipient of coal consumption subsidies totalling US$2 billion in 2017. Coal in Turkey benefited from substantial subsidies in 2021.

Stranded assets
Some coal-fired power stations could become stranded assets, for example China Energy Investment, the world's largest power company, risks losing half its capital. However, state-owned electricity utilities such as Eskom in South Africa, Perusahaan Listrik Negara in Indonesia, Sarawak Energy in Malaysia, Taipower in Taiwan, EGAT in Thailand, Vietnam Electricity and EÜAŞ in Turkey are building or planning new plants. As of 2021 this may be helping to cause a carbon bubble which could cause financial instability if it bursts.

Politics
Countries building or financing new coal-fired power stations, such as China, India, Indonesia, Vietnam, Turkey and Bangladesh, face mounting international criticism for obstructing the aims of the Paris Agreement.  In 2019, the Pacific Island nations (in particular Vanuatu and Fiji) criticized Australia for failing to cut their emissions at a faster rate than they were, citing concerns about coastal inundation and erosion. In May 2021, the G7 members agreed to end new direct government support for international coal power generation.

Opposition to coal

Opposition to coal pollution was one of the main reasons the modern environmental movement started in the 19th century.

Transition away from coal

In order to meet global climate goals and provide power to those that do not currently have it coal power must be reduced from nearly 10,000 TWh to less than 2,000 TWh by 2040. Phasing out coal has short-term health and environmental benefits which exceed the costs, but some countries still favor coal, and there is much disagreement about how quickly it should be phased out. However many countries, such as the Powering Past Coal Alliance, have already or are transitioned away from coal; the largest transition announced so far being Germany, which is due to shut down its last coal-fired power station between 2035 and 2038. Some countries use the ideas of a "Just Transition", for example to use some of the benefits of transition to provide early pensions for coal miners. However, low-lying Pacific Islands are concerned the transition is not fast enough and that they will be inundated by sea level rise, so they have called for OECD countries to completely phase out coal by 2030 and other countries by 2040. In 2020, although China built some plants, globally more coal power was retired than built: the UN Secretary General has also said that OECD countries should stop generating electricity from coal by 2030 and the rest of the world by 2040. Phasing down coal was agreed at COP26 in the Glasgow Climate Pact. Vietnam is among few coal-dependent developing countries that pledged to phase out unabated coal power by the 2040s or as early as possible thereafter

Peak coal

Switch to cleaner fuels and lower carbon electricity generation

Coal-fired generation puts out about twice as much carbon dioxide—around a tonne for every megawatt hour generated—as electricity generated by burning natural gas at 500 kg of greenhouse gas per megawatt hour. In addition to generating electricity, natural gas is also popular in some countries for heating and as an automotive fuel.

The use of coal in the United Kingdom declined as a result of the development of North Sea oil and the subsequent dash for gas during the 1990s. In Canada some coal power plants, such as the Hearn Generating Station, switched from coal to natural gas. In 2017, coal power in the US provided 30% of the electricity, down from approximately 49% in 2008, due to plentiful supplies of low cost natural gas obtained by hydraulic fracturing of tight shale formations.

Coal regions in transition
Some coal-mining regions are highly dependent on coal.

Employment

Some coal miners are concerned their jobs may be lost in the transition. A just transition from coal is supported by the European Bank for Reconstruction and Development.

Bioremediation

The white rot fungus Trametes versicolor can grow on and metabolize naturally occurring coal. The bacteria Diplococcus has been found to degrade coal, raising its temperature.

Cultural usage
Coal is the official state mineral of Kentucky and the official state rock of Utah; both US states have a historic link to coal mining.

Some cultures hold that children who misbehave will receive only a lump of coal from Santa Claus for Christmas in their stockings instead of presents.

It is also customary and considered lucky in Scotland and the North of England to give coal as a gift on New Year's Day. This occurs as part of first-footing and represents warmth for the year to come.

See also

 
 
 
 
 
  (stratigraphic unit)

Notes

References

Sources

Further reading

External links

 Coal Transitions
 World Coal Association
 Coal – International Energy Agency
 Coal Online – International Energy Agency 
 CoalExit
 European Association for Coal and Lignite
 Coal news and industry magazine
 Global Coal Plant Tracker
 Centre for Research on Energy and Clean Air
 
 
 

 
Coal mining
Economic geology
Fuels
Sedimentary rocks
Solid fuels
Fossil fuels